Jean-Jo Marmouyet (born 9 August 1984) is a French professional rugby union player. He plays at flanker for Bayonne in the Top 14.

References

External links
Ligue Nationale De Rugby Profile
European Professional Club Rugby Profile
Bayonne Profile

Living people
French rugby union players
Rugby union flankers
1984 births
Sportspeople from Bayonne
Aviron Bayonnais players